Map is an indie pop band from Riverside, CA that consists of Josh Dooley (guitar, Voice, Harmonica), Paul Akers (Keyboards) and Trevor Monks (drums).

Biography
Josh Dooley formed Map in 2000, recording two EPs, Teaching Turtles to Fly, and Eastern Skies, Western Eyes.

Map released their first full-length record, Secrets By The Highway, in 2003.

In the summer of 2004, Map released their second full-length record, Think Like An Owner. This album was his first record backed by his current band line-up, consisting of Loop (bass), Heather Bray (guitar, voice) and Ben Heywood (drums).

Map released their third EP, San Francisco in the 90s, with more additions to their band line-up, consisting of Paul Akers (keyboards) and Trevor Monks (drums). This album gives tribute to late-80s Brit pop and mid-60s American jangle rock.

Discography

Full-length albums
Secrets By the Highway (2003, Velvet Blue Music)
Think Like an Owner (2004, Velvet Blue Music)
Speechless (2009, Velvet Blue Music)
Pistols & Pearls (2010, Independent)
Loneliness is Dangerous (2011, Independent)

EPs
Teaching Turtles To Fly (2000, Velvet Blue Music)
Eastern Skies, Western Eyes (2001, Velvet Blue Music)
San Francisco in the 90's (2006, Velvet Blue Music)

Singles (7-inch vinyl)
A Monk With a Gun (2005, Velvet Blue Music)
Friends Who Play Guitar (2006, ClerestoryAV) Map/Gary Murray split single

External links
Official website
Facebook page
Velvet Blue's press page
Josh Dooley's 10 most influential albums

Indie pop groups from California